The  is a communist political party in Japan. With approximately 270,000 members belonging to 18,000 branches, it is one of the largest non-governing communist parties in the world.

The party advocates the establishment of a democratic society based on scientific socialism and pacificism. It believes this objective can be achieved by working within an electoral framework while carrying out an extra-parliamentary struggle against "imperialism and its subordinate ally, monopoly capital". As such, the JCP does not advocate violent revolution and instead proposes a "democratic revolution" to achieve "democratic change in politics and the economy". A staunchly antimilitarist party, the JCP firmly supports Article 9 of the Japanese Constitution and aims to dissolve the Japan Self-Defense Forces. The party also opposes Japan's security alliance with the United States, viewing it as an unequal partnership and an infringement on Japanese national sovereignty.

In the wake of the Sino-Soviet split, the JCP began to distance itself from the Eastern Bloc, especially the Soviet Union. The party consequently did not suffer an internal crisis as a result of the Soviet Union's collapse in 1991; instead, it welcomed the dissolution of the Communist Party of the Soviet Union, which it described as the "embodi[ment] of the historical evil of great power chauvinism and hegemonism".

History

Prewar roots
The Japanese Communist Party was founded in Tokyo on 15 July 1922. Its early leadership was drawn from the anarcho-syndicalist and Christian socialist movements that developed around the turn of the century. From the former came Yamakawa Hitoshi, Sakai Toshihiko, and Arahata Kanson, who had all been supporters of Kōtoku Shūsui, an anarchist executed in 1911. Katayama Sen, another early party leader, had been a Christian socialist for much of his political life. The three former anarchists were reluctant to found the JCP, with Yamakawa shortly after arguing that Japan was not ready for a communist party and calling for work to be done solely within labor unions. Katayama's theoretical understanding of Marxism also remained low.

Outlawed and persecuted

The JCP was founded as an underground political association. Outlawed in 1925 with the passage of the Peace Preservation Law, the JCP was subjected to repression and persecution by the Special Higher Police (Tokkō), nicknamed the "Thought Police". JCP members and sympathizers were imprisoned and pressured to "convert" (tenkō suru) to anti-communist nationalism. Many of those who refused to convert remained imprisoned for the duration of the Pacific War. The Japanese Communist Party member Hotsumi Ozaki, who was part of the Richard Sorge spy ring for the Kremlin, was the only Japanese person hanged for treason under the Peace Preservation Law.

Postwar reemergence
The Japan Communist Party was legalized in 1945 by the Allied military occupation of Japan and since then has been a legal political party able to contest elections. In the aftermath of the war, under the guidance of charismatic party chairman Sanzō Nosaka, the party pursued a policy of portraying itself as "lovable". Nosaka's strategy involved avoiding open calls for violent revolution and taking advantage of the seemingly pro-labor stance of the Occupation to organize the urban working classes and win power at the ballot box and through propaganda. In particular, the party was successful in winning acceptance of the notion that communists had been the only ones to resist Japanese wartime militarism. This propaganda effort won the party thousands of new members and an even larger number of sympathizers, especially among artists and intellectuals. The party rapidly built up its strength and in 1949, made unprecedented gains by winning 10 percent of the vote and sending 35 representatives to the Diet.

Red Purge and turn to violence
Beginning in the fall of 1949, in reaction to the JCP's electoral success and as part of the "Reverse Course" in Occupation policy amid rising Cold War tensions, the U.S.-led occupation authorities and the Japanese government carried out a sweeping Red Purge, firing tens of thousands of communists and suspected communists from government posts, teaching positions at universities, high schools, and primary schools, as well as from private corporations. The purge was further intensified in response to the outbreak of the Korean War.

Against this backdrop in January 1950, the Soviet-led Cominform, at the behest of Soviet premier Joseph Stalin, issued a blistering criticism of the JCP's peaceful line as "opportunism" and "glorifying American imperialism". It also demanded that the JCP carry out an immediate violent revolution along Maoist lines. This devastating "Cominform Criticism" led rival JCP factions to compete for the Cominform's approval, and ultimately led to the militant  which declared that "it would be a serious mistake to think that Japan's liberation can be achieved through peaceful, democratic means" and called for an immediate violent revolution. The result was a campaign of violence in which JCP activists threw Molotov cocktails at police boxes and cadres were sent up into the mountains with instructions to organize ostensibly oppressed farmers into "mountain guerrilla squads".

The backlash to the JCP's new militant line was swift and severe. Militants were rounded up, tried, and sentenced to lengthy prison terms, and in the 1952 general election, Japanese voters vented their ire at the JCP by stripping the party of every single one of its 35 Diet seats, a blow from which it would take two decades to recover. Stunned, the JCP gradually began to pull back from its militant line, a process facilitated by the death of Stalin in 1953. At the 6th Party Congress in 1955, the JCP renounced the militant line completely, returning to its old "peaceful line" of gradually pursuing socialist revolution through peaceful, democratic means.

Anpo protests

In 1960, the JCP played a central role in organizing the massive Anpo protests against the U.S.–Japan Security Treaty, which were the largest protests in Japan's history. The JCP took a different line than the Japan Socialist Party, Sohyo labor federation, and other groups who argued that the main target of the protest movement was Japanese monopoly capitalism. Instead, the JCP argued that the main enemy was American imperialism, and along with affiliated groups, focused its protests around the U.S. Embassy in Tokyo. Accordingly, JCP-linked groups were the driving force behind the "Hagerty Incident" in which the car carrying U.S. President Eisenhower's press secretary James Hagerty was mobbed outside of Tokyo's Haneda Airport on 10 June 1960, provoking a major international incident and helping to precipitate the downfall of the Nobusuke Kishi cabinet.

The Anpo protests were a turning point in the JCP's ongoing attempts to revive its political fortunes after the disastrous turn toward violent revolution in the early 1950s. Although the Maoists had been purged from the party following the earlier disaster, the JCP was still riven by the age-old rivalry between the Rōnō Ha (Worker-Farmer Faction) and the Kōza Ha (Lecture Faction), which dated back to the prewar era. Among other disagreements, the two factions disagreed over which stage of Marxist development Japan was currently in; the Rōnō Ha believed that Japan had already achieved full capitalism, which meant that an immediate socialist revolution was possible, whereas the Kōza Ha argued that Japan's transition to capitalism was not yet complete and that therefore what was needed was a "two-stage" revolutionfirst a "democratic revolution" that would overthrow American imperialism and establish true democracy, and then a "socialist revolution" that would establish communism. Although the "mainstream" of the JCP, led by Kenji Miyamoto, favored the Kōza Ha interpretation, as late as the 7th Party Congress in 1958 the "anti-mainstream" Rōnō Ha faction, led by Shōjirō Kasuga, still controlled around 40 percent of the delegates.

The Anpo protests greatly strengthened the hand of the Kōza Ha faction. During the protest, the JCP, still scarred by the backlash to its violent line in the 1950s, consistently advocated peaceful, orderly, and restrained protests. This stance was highly unpopular with the radical student activists of the Zengakuren student federation, who broke decisively with the JCP as a result and began to build a New Left student movement. However, the movement proved unpopular with the broader public, and the JCP was able to use its image as a "peaceful" and "positive" force during the protests as a recruitment tool. Membership in the party soared during the course of the protests, doubling from 40,000 to 80,000, and most of the new recruits wound up supporting the Kōza Ha line.

Over the remainder of the 1960s, the Kōza Ha was able to purge many members from the Rōnō Ha faction, and others, dissatisfied with JCP policies, quit the party of their own accord. Miyamoto was able to cement his control over the party and reigned as party chairman all the way until 1982. Meanwhile, the party's membership continued to grow rapidly, and the party began to make steady gains at the ballot box, winning more and more seats in the National Diet. By the mid-1960s, the United States Department of State estimated party membership to be approximately 120,000 (0.2% of the working-age population), and the party had acquired around 300,000 members by 1970.

Sino-Soviet split

The party did not take sides during the Sino-Soviet split of the 1960s. Its politics were independent of the Soviet Union. Reflecting this, the party chairman Miyamoto announced the JCP's opposition to the 1968 Soviet invasion of Czechoslovakia. At the same time, the party had distanced itself from Mao and Maoism, which allowed it to avoid being associated with China's Great Leap Forward and Cultural Revolution once they started coming more fully to light in the 1970s. In July 1969, the JCP declared that if it ever came to power, it would permit the free functioning of opposition parties, in an effort to distinguish itself from the one-party states in the Soviet Union and China. In 1976, mentions of "Marxism–Leninism" in the party program were changed to "scientific socialism".

These efforts proved popular among Japanese voters. In the 1972 general election, the JCP won an astonishing 38 seats in the Diet, surpassing its 1949 high of 35 and signalling the party's full recovery from the disastrous militant line of the early 1950s. Party membership continued to grow in the 1970s, albeit at a slower rate than in the 1960s, reaching approximately 500,000 members by 1980.

1980s to 21st century

During the 1980s, party membership began to decline, falling to 370,000 by 1997 and 270,000 by 2023. 

After the dissolution of the Soviet Union, the JCP released a press statement titled "We welcome the end of a party which embodied the historical evil of great power chauvinism and hegemonism". The party also criticized the Eastern Bloc countries which abandoned socialism, describing their decisions as a "reversal of history". Consequently, the party did not suffer an internal crisis as a result of the Soviet Union's collapse in 1991, nor did it consider disbanding or changing its name. Owing to a significant loss in electoral support, however, the party revised its policies in the 1990s and became a more traditional democratic socialist party.

Lam Peng Er argued in the Pacific Affairs in 1996 that "the JCP's viability is crucial to the health of Japanese democracy" because "[i]t is the only established party in parliament that has not been coopted by the conservative parties. It performs the watchdog role against the ruling parties without fear or favor. More importantly, the JCP often offers the only opposition candidate in prefectural governorship, city mayoral and other local elections. Despite the ostensible differences between the non-Communist parties at the national level, they often support a joint candidate for governor or mayor so that all parties are assured of being part of the ruling coalition. If the JCP did not offer a candidate, there would be a walkover and Japanese voters would be offered a fait accompli without an electoral avenue of protest. Promoting women candidates in elections to win women's votes is another characteristic of the party. More women are elected under the Communist label than other political parties in Japan."

In 2008, foreign media recorded an increase in support for the party due to the effect of the global financial crisis on Japanese workers. However, the party failed to increase its number of seats in the 2009 general election. Subsequently, the projected decline of the party was halted, with the JCP becoming the third-largest party in the Tokyo Metropolitan Assembly and making gains in the House of Councillors, going from six to 11 seats. The party surged in the 2014 elections, receiving 7,040,130 votes (13.3%) in the constituency section and 6,062,962 (11.37%) in the party lists.

During the nomination period of the July 2016 House of Councillors election, the party signed an agreement with the Democratic, Social Democratic and People's Life parties to field a jointly endorsed candidate in each of the 32 districts in which only one seat was contested, uniting in an attempt to take control of the House from the LDP/Komeito coalition. JCP leaders expressed willingness to enter into a coalition with the Democratic Party, a notion which was rejected by then-Democratic Party President Katsuya Okada as being "impossible" in the near future due to what he viewed as some of the "extreme leftist policies" promoted by the JCP. The party had three Councillors up for re-election and fielded a total of 56 candidates in the election, down from 63 candidates in the 2013 election, but still the second-highest number after the LDP. However, only 14 of those candidates contested single- and multi-member districts, while 42 contested the 48-seat national proportional representation block.

Ideology and policies 
The JCP is one of the largest non-governing communist parties in the world. It is considered to be left-wing to far-left.

Pacifism 
The JCP has traditionally championed pacifism. With regards to the Japan Self-Defence Forces (Japan's armed forces), the JCP's current policy is that it is not principally opposed to its existence (in 2000 the party stated that it would agree to its use should Japan ever be attacked), but that it will seek to abolish it in the long term, international situation permitting. The JCP also opposes possession of nuclear weapons by any country or the concept of military blocs and opposes any attempt to revise Article 9 of the Japanese Constitution, which says that "never again... [will Japan] be visited with the horrors of war through the action of government". Regarding the resolution of disputes, it argues that priority must be given to peaceful means through negotiations, not to military solutions. The JCP says that Japan must adhere to the United Nations Charter.

Economic policy 
The JCP strives to change the nation's economic policy of what it sees as serving the interests of large corporations and banks to one of "defending the interests of the people", and to establish "democratic rules" that will check the activities of large corporations and "protect the lives and basic rights of the people".

Regarding the issue of the international economy, the JCP has advocated establishing a new international democratic economic order on the basis of respect for the economic sovereignty of each country and strongly opposes the participation to the TPP. The JCP sees the United States, transnational corporations and international financial capital as pushing globalization, which it says is seriously affecting the global economy, including the monetary and financial problems as well as North–South and environmental problems. The JCP advocates "democratic regulation of activities by transnational corporations and international financial capital on an international scale".

In September 2015, after the passage of the 2015 Japanese military legislation, the JCP called for cooperation from other opposition parties to form an interim government to abolish the bills. It was the first time the party had called for such cooperation with other parties.

Social policy 
The Japanese Communist Party is generally regarded as the most progressive party in Japanese politics. The JCP has traditionally been opposed to the existence of the Imperial House since the pre-war days. However, the party changed its stance in 2004 by acknowledging the Emperor as Japan's head of state. The JCP has stated that it supports the establishment of a democratic republic, but also that "[the monarchy] continuation or discontinuation should be decided by the will of the majority of the people in future, when the time is ripe to do so". It is also against Japan's use of its national flag and national anthem which it sees as a relic of Japan's militarist past.

LGBT rights and feminism 
The JCP jointly supports 'LGBT equality Law' with Constitutional Democratic Party of Japan, Social Democratic Party and Reiwa Shinsengumi. The JCP supports the legalization of same-sex marriage.

The JCP has maintained a friendly relationship with the Japanese feminist camp since its inception, and is still the most active in women's rights issues among major Japanese political parties. The JCP supports eliminating the wage gap between men and women. It also advocates for more women in politics and political life.

Foreign policy 
One of the JCP's main objectives is terminating the Japan–United States military alliance and the dismantling of all American military bases in Japan. It wants to make Japan a non-aligned and neutral country, in accordance with its principles of self-determination and national sovereignty. There are about 130 American military bases and other related facilities in Japan, with Okinawa Prefecture having the largest American military base in. The JCP adheres to the idea that Japan as an Asian country must stop putting emphasis on diplomacy centering on relations with the United States and the G8 Summit and put Asian diplomacy at the center of its foreign relations. It supports establishing an "independent foreign policy in the interests of the Japanese people" and rejects "uncritically following any foreign power".

The JCP advocates that Japan issue further apologies for its actions during World War II and has condemned prime ministerial visits to Yasukuni Shrine. In the 1930s, while the JCP was still illegal, it was the only political party to vocally oppose Japan's war with China. The JCP supports Japanese territorial claims over the Kuril and Senkaku Islands and Liancourt Rocks. Furthermore, the JCP has condemned North Korea's nuclear-weapons testing, calling for effective sanctions, but opposing the prospect of a military response.

In 2020, the JCP revised its platform for the first time since 2004. The new platform criticized the Chinese Communist Party, denouncing China's "great-power chauvinism and hegemonism" as "an adverse current to world peace and progress". The JCP also removed a line from its platform which described China as a country "that is beginning a new quest for socialism". JCP members have stated that this was due to human rights conditions in China. The Ministry of Foreign Affairs of China denounced the accusations of the JCP as "groundless and biased".

Opposition to anti-South Korean sentiment 

The JCP's leading politicians are known to be the most active opponents of anti-South Korean "Kenkan" racism and xenophobia. Major modern JCP politicians criticize Japanese politicians for instigating contempt and exclusivism toward Korea, and oppose all forms of historical revisionism toward Korean history and Japanese war crimes. It was also one of the few Japanese parties to support the Korean independence movement before 1945. In South Korea, it is known as the only "pro-South Korea" (친한 or 친한파) political party in Japan. Although it is illegal to form a communist political party in South Korea, Mindan is friendly relations with the JCP.

The JCP criticizes hegemonism in the United States and China, and criticizes North Korea's dictatorship. In contrast, the JCP is friendly to South Korea, which has been democratized since 1987. South Korean media describe the JCP as actively opposing Japanese nationalism and having the most correct perception of colonial victims and Japanese war crimes.

Organization 
According to the party constitution, the highest body of the JCP is the Party Congress, organized by the Central Committee every 2–3 years, though it may be postponed in special circumstances. Between the congresses, the highest body is the Central Committee, elected by the Party Congress. The Central Committee meets two times every year and can also hold a plenum at the request of one-third of its membership. The Central Committee is made out of regular and alternate members; the latter can precipitate in Central Committee meetings but cannot vote. The Central Committee also elects the Executive Committee of the Central Committee, and its chairpersons and vice-chairpersons, the head of the Secretariat and may also elect the chairperson of the Central Committee. The current chairman of the Executive Committee of the Central Committee of the JCP is Kazuo Shii. The Central Committee also appoints the Disciplinary Commission and the Audit Commission.

The Executive Committee manages party affairs between Central Committee meetings. It appoints the members of the Secretariat, which manages the day-to-day affairs of the party center, and the Central Organ Paper Editors Commission. It also elects the Standing Committee of the Executive Committee.

The party officially upholds democratic centralism. The JCP is unique amongst major Japanese political parties for the continuity of its leaders, with Shii having served as JCP chairman since 2000.

Press
Shimbun Akahata (Japanese: Red Flag Newspaper) is the daily organ of the JCP in the form of a national newspaper. Musansha Shinbun (Japanese: Proletarian News) was another publication of the party which was circulated between 1925 and 1929. Several other newspapers preceded and merged into Red Flag, including Daini Musansha Shinbun (Japanese: The Second Proletarian News), which was merged into Red Flag in 1932. Daini Musansha Shinbun was itself the immediate successor to the original The Proletarian News, which was banned by the government in September 1929. Daini Musansha Shinbun began publication immediately after the ban.

In the past, the party published numerous other newspapers as well, including another national paper called Nihon Seiji Shinbun (Japanese: Japan Political News) and a theoretical journal called Zenshin (Japanese: Forward). The party also published several regional newspapers such as Class War in and around Kyoto, Osaka and Kobe, Shinetsu Red Flag in Nagano and Hokkaido News in Hokkaido. They also published numerous (the exact number is unknown) factory newspapers.

Some regional newspapers, such as Shin Kanagawa (Japanese: New Kanagawa) in Kanagawa, are still published.

Affiliated organizations 
The youth wing of JCP is the Democratic Youth League of Japan. In the 1920s and 1930s, the organization published several newspapers of its own, including Rēnin Seinen (English: Lenin Youth) and Proletarian Youth.

The party also has affiliate medical and consumer co-ops. The Japanese Consumers' Co-Operative Union (JCCU), the umbrella body of the co-operative movement in Japan, has a sizable number of communists in its ranks, although the exact numbers are difficult to verify. Another example of the JCP's prevalence in the co-operative movement is the Co-op Kanagawa in the Kanagawa Prefecture, which has 800,000 members and has historical ties to the JCP. It still advertises and occasionally is published in JCP newspapers such as Red Flag and New Kanagawa. The prevalence of house unions in Japan as opposed to enterprise unions has prompted much of the exceptional development of other organizations by the JCP, as well as causing the JCP to seek other external organizational support, including from kōenkai.

The  is a musical group which supports the JCP. The group was founded in Kyoto in 2011 and is directed by Tadao Yamamoto, a composer, accordionist, choir director and ordinary member of the National Council of The Singing Voice of Japan. In various cultural events organized by the party, the Choir of JCP-fans appears as an element among the joined choirs of the volunteer singers of The Singing Voice of Japan. As of 2016, the choir is the only organization of Japanese musicians specializing in political support and in the cultural activity of the party.

Notable concerts and performances by the choir include:
 11 February 2011, Kyoto Kaikan Hall: Concert sponsored by the Kyoto Committee of the Japanese Communist Party (JCP).
 23 September 2014, Takaragaike Park (Kyoto): Festival Kyoto ed. 2014, organized by the Kyoto Committee of the JCP.
 1 February 2015, Kyoiku Bunka Center (Kyoto): Festival sponsored by the Kyoto Committee of the JCP.

Membership 
In January 2014, the JCP had approximately 320,000 members. Following the party's advancement in the 2013 Tokyo prefectural election, there had been an increase in membership growth, with over 1,000 people joining in each of the final three months of 2013. Approximately 20% of new members during this period were aged 20–40, showing a higher ratio of young people joining the party than in the past. More recently, membership numbers have declined, with membership at around 300,000 in 2017 and 270,000 in 2020.

Notable members

Pre-war (1922–1941) 
 Kanson Arahata
 Sen Katayama
 Hajime Kawakami
 Fukumoto Kazuo
 Takiji Kobayashi
 Toshihiko Sakai
 Hitoshi Yamakawa

Wartime (1941–1945) 
 Kim Chon-hae
 Sanzō Nosaka
 Yoshio Shiga
 Kyuichi Tokuda

Post-war (1945–present) 
 Kiyoteru Hanada
 Kenji Miyamoto
 Hiromu Murakami
 Tetsuzo Fuwa
 Kazuo Shii
 Hisashi Inoue
 Takeshi Kimura

Leaders

Electoral performance

House of Representatives 
Prior to 1996, the entire House of Representatives was elected by majoritarian / "semi-proportional" voting systems with votes cast for individuals (1946: limited voting in multi-member districts, 1947 to 1993 SNTV in multi-member districts). Since 1996, the House of Representatives is elected in a parallel election system—essentially two separate elections only in the lower house complicated by the fact that a candidate may stand in both segments and the sekihairitsu system which ties proportional list ranking to FPTP results: only the majority of members the House of Representatives, 295 (initially 300) seats, are elected in a majoritarian system with voting for candidates (first-past-the-post in single-member districts), while the remaining 180 (initially 200) seats are elected by a proportional representation system (votes are cast for party lists in regional multi-member districts, called "blocks" in the House of Representatives). The votes and vote percentages in the table below are the JCP candidates' vote totals for the whole election from before 1993 and just the votes for the party in the election to the 180 proportional seats after 1996.

The JCP polled 11.3 percent of the vote in 2000, 8.2 percent in 2003, 7.3 percent in 2005, 7.0 percent in 2009, and 6.2 percent in 2012. These results seemed to indicate a trend of declining support, but the party won 21 seats in 2014, up from eight in the previous general election, as the JCP received 7,040,130 votes (13.3 percent) in the constituency section and 6,062,962 (11.37 percent) in the party lists. This continued a new wave of support that was also evident in the 2013 Tokyo prefectural election in which the party doubled its representation. Fighting on a platform directly opposed to neoliberalism, the Trans-Pacific Partnership, attempts to rewrite the constitution, United States Forces Japan, and nuclear power, the JCP tapped into a minority current that seeks an alternative to Japan's rightward direction. Following the 2016 Japanese House of Councillors election, the party held 13 seats in the House of Councillors. After the 2017 Japanese general election, the party held 12 seats in the House of Representatives, and since the 2021 Japanese general election, it holds 10 seats.

House of Councillors 
Elections to the House of Councillors are staggered. Every three years, half of the House is up for election to six-year terms. In addition, a parallel election system is used: the majority of members of the House of Councillors (currently 146 of 242, or 73 in one regular election to one half of the House) are elected in 45 (formerly 46→47) prefectural districts, votes are cast for individual candidates by SNTV, but with both multi- and single-member districts used and in the latter SNTV becomes identical to FPTP (winner-takes-all). The remaining, currently 96 members (48 per regular election) are elected in one nationwide district. Until 1980, votes there were cast for individuals too by SNTV. Since 1983, votes are cast for party lists and the seats are allocated proportionally (d'Hondt) in the nationwide district. Unlike in general elections to the lower house, a candidate may not be nominated in both segments of one regular election to the upper house. The seats totals show below are the JCP's overall post-election seat totals, not just their seats elected in that particular year. The votes shown are the votes in the election for the 48 (formerly 50) seats in the nationwide SNTV/PR segment.

Current Diet members

House of Representatives 

 Seiken Akamine (Okinawa-1st)
 Akira Kasai (Tokyo PR)
 Keiji Kokuta (Kinki PR, contested Kyoto-1st)
 Takeshi Miyamoto (Kinki PR)

 Tōru Miyamoto (Tokyo PR, contested Tokyo-20th)
 Nobuko Motomura (Tōkai PR)
 Kazuo Shii (Minami-Kantō PR)
 Tetsuya Shiokawa (Kita-Kantō PR)
 Chizuko Takahashi (Tōhoku PR)
 Takaaki Tamura (Kyushu PR, contested Fukuoka-10th)

House of Councillors 

 Up for re-election in 2019
 Satoshi Inoue (National PR)
 Tomoko Kami (National PR)
 Yoshiko Kira (Tokyo at-large)
 Akira Koike (National PR)
 Akiko Kurabayashi (Kyoto at-large)
 Sōhei Nihi (National PR)
 Kōtarō Tatsumi (Osaka at-large)
 Yoshiki Yamashita (National PR)

 Up for re-election in 2022
 Mikishi Daimon (National PR)
 Tadayoshi Ichida (National PR)
 Tomo Iwabuchi (National PR)
 Ryōsuke Takeda (National PR)
 Tomoko Tamura (National PR)
 Taku Yamazoe (Tokyo at-large)

See also 

 Appeal to the People
 Democracy in Marxism
 Democratic Youth League of Japan
 Japanese dissidence during the early Shōwa period
 List of foreign delegations at the 21st Japanese Communist Party Congress
 List of foreign delegations at the 22nd Japanese Communist Party Congress
 Relations between Japanese Revolutionaries and the Comintern and the Soviet Union
 Socialist thought in Imperial Japan
 Zengakuren

Notes

References

Citations

Sources

Books

Journal articles

Further reading
 Peter Berton and Sam Atherton, "The Japanese Communist Party: Permanent Opposition, but Moral Compass." New York: Routledge, 2018.
 T.E. Durkee, The Communist Party of Japan, 1919–1932. PhD dissertation. Stanford University, 1953.
 G.A. Hoston, Marxism and the Crisis of Development in Prewar Japan. Princeton, NJ: Princeton University Press, 1986.
 Hong M. Kim, Deradicalization of the Japanese Communist Party Under Kenji Miyamoto. Cambridge University Press, 1976.
 Stephen S. Large, The Romance of Revolution in Japanese Anarchism and Communism during the Taishō Period. Cambridge University Press, 1977.
 Robert A. Scalapino, The Japanese Communist Movement: 1920–1966. London: Cambridge University Press. 1967.
 R. Swearingen and P. Langer, Red Flag in Japan: International Communism in Action, 1919–1951. Cambridge, MA: Harvard University Press, 1952.

External links 

 
 
 
 
 
 
 Article on Japanese Communist Party from Japanese Press Translations 1945–1946. Dartmouth Digital Library Collections.
 
  Modern Japan Archives. 6 June 1950.
 
 
 Kazuo Shii: Comments from the Japanese Communist Party on the upcoming election. YouTube video (in English) of the JCP leader Kazuo Shii discussing the 2014 Japanese general election. Uploaded 8 December 2014.
 

 
Anti-militarism
Anti-nuclear movement
Anti-imperialism in Asia
Anti-imperialist organizations
Anti-racism in Asia
Anti-racist organizations
Communist parties in Japan
Democratic socialist parties in Asia
Far-left politics in Japan
Formerly banned communist parties
Korean independence movement
Left-wing parties in Asia
LGBT political advocacy groups in Japan
Mindan
Pacifist parties
Political parties in Japan
Progressive parties in Japan
International Meeting of Communist and Workers Parties